Terre humaine (Human Earth) is a French-Canadian soap opera TV series written by Mia Riddez which originally aired on Radio-Canada from September 18, 1978 to June 4, 1984, totalling 229 episodes.

Plot

The show takes place in rural Quebec and explores the lives of the Jacquemins, a family of farmers. At the center of it is Léandre "Pépère" Jaquemin, the elder of the family, his son Antoine and his spouse Jeanne, who are witnesses to the difficulties their children and their friends face, all of which builds scenes for a good novel.

Cast

 Guy Provost as Antoine Jacquemin
 Marjolaine Hébert as Jeanne Jacquemin
 Jean Duceppe as Léandre Jacquemin
 Raymond Legault as Jean-François Jacquemin
 Sylvie Léonard as Annick Jacquemin
 Jean-Jacques Desjardins as Martin Jacquemin
 Dorothée Berryman as Berthe Jacquemin-Dantin
 Denyse Chartier as Élisabeth Demaison
 Alain Gélinas as Michel Jacquemin
 Serge Turgeon as Laurent Dantin
 Louis De Santis as Jonas Jacquemin
 Jacqueline Plouffe as Eléonore Jacquemin
 Aubert Pallascio as Frédéric Jacquemin
 Élisabeth Chouvalidzé as Josée Dubreuil
 Reine France as Marthe Parrot
 Edgar Fruitier as Hector Bastarache
 Françoise Graton as Stéphanie Dubreuil
 Sita Riddez as Simone Dubreuil
 Yves Massicotte as Ovila Demaison
 Janine Fluet as Orise Demaison
 Denis Mercier as Hugues Lacroix
 Suzanne Léveillé as Mireille Dutilly
 Madeleine Sicotte as Carmelle Dutilly
 Marthe Choquette as Pauline Landry
 Diane Charbonneau as Corinne Prieur
 Mimi D'Estée as Marguerite Lacoursière
 Alain Charbonneau as Joseph Jacquemin
 Danielle Schneider as Jocelyne Jacquemin
 Mitsou as Annouk Jacquemin
 Suzanne Marier as Pierrette Jacquemin
 Julien Bessette as Réal Jacquemin
 Yvan Benoît as Robin Laroche
 Yves Allaire as Rolland
 Yolande Binet as Alice Landry
 Denis Bouchard as Pit
 Paul E. Boutet as Paul Boutet
 Rachel Cailhier as Gervaise Cadieux
 René Caron as Jacques Quirion
 Francine Caron-Panaccio as Lise de Carufel
 Marie-Josée Caya as Julie Coallier
 Jean-Raymond Châles as Gilles Coallier
 Jacinthe Chaussé as Madeleine Sanderson
 Liliane Clune as Lucie Goyette
 Gilbert Comtois as Paulo Lacasse
 Rolland D'Amour as Hilaire Jacquemin
 Larry Michel Demers as Rod Bélisle
 Jean-Luc Denis as Bercy
 Jean Deschênes as Éric Belval
 Yves Desgagnés as Raymond Gaudette
 Robert Desroches as Louis de Carufel
 Claude Desrosiers as Philippe Demaison
 Paul Dion as Gérald Morency
 Anne-Marie Ducharme as Gisèle Gervais
 Yvan Ducharme as Jean-Guy Roy
 Lisette Dufour as Lina Jacquemin
 Ghyslain Filion as Daniel Bertrand
 Jacques Fortier as Georges
 Louiselle Fortier as Jocelyne
 Ronald France as Dr. Turgeon
 Sébastien Frappier as François Jacquemin
 J. Léo Gagnon as René Parrot
 Pat Gagnon as Maurice Gélinas
 Benjamin Gauthier as Jean-François Jacquemin
 Marcel Gauthier as Marcel Dutilly
 Annette Garant as Nathalie
 Paul Gauthier as Yves Larin
 Gérald Gilbert as Patrick Gignac
 Luc Gingras as Raymond Bellemare
 Marcel Girard as Dr. Lemay
 Renée Girard as Thérèse Parrot
 Sylvie Gosselin as Lysiane Bastarache
 Blaise Gouin as Adélard Rancourt
 Claude Grisé as Dr. Marois
 Roger Guertin as Bertrand Rioux
 Roseline Hoffman as Béatrice Giria
 Laurent Imbault as Philippe
 Ian Ireland as Thomas Sanderson
 Roland Jetté as Gervais
 Olivier Landry as the son of Anne Biron
 Serge Lasalle as Hermas Dehoux
 Jean-Guy Latour as Marcelin Ménard
 Marc Legault as Roger Bertrand
 Yvon Leroux as Arthur Chrétien
 Jean-François Lesage as Rolland Longtin
 Jean-Pierre Légaré as Henri
 Michelle Léger as Anne Biron
 Jacques L'Heureux as Pierre Jolivet
 Angélique Martel as Agnès Sanderson
 Walter Massey as Dr. O'Neil
 Jean-Pierre Masson as André "Ti-Dré" Fafard
 Louise Matteau as Ève-Marie Roy
 René Migliaccio as Guy Guimond
 Denise Morelle as Gertrude Jacquemin
 Rock Ménard : as Mr. Lalancette
 Gilles Normand as Sergeant Beaurivage
 Lucille Papineau as Anne-Marie Chrétien
 Gérard Paradis as Réjean Dubreuil
 Jean-Louis Paris as Curé Maillet
 Chantal Perrier as Catherine
 Louise Portal as Isabelle Dantin
 Gilles Quenneville as Olivier
 Claude Ravenel as Adrien Dupras
 José Rettino as Vidal Thérien
 Jean Ricard as Sergeant Durivage
 Annick Robitaille as Hélène Dantin
 Carole Chatel as Anita Lopez
 Stéphanie Robitaille as Nathalie Dantin
 Anne-Marie Rocher as Véronique Roy
 Dominique Roy as Madeleine L'Heureux
 Diane St-Onge as Éléonore Jacquemin (young)
 Jacques Tourangeau as Jacques Riopel
 Johanne Tremblay as Annette
 Béatrix Van Til as Marie-Mélie Chrétien
 Robert Toupin as Jean-Louis Laverdière
 Richard Thériault as Marc Biron
 Michel Bergeron as Marc Préville
 Sylvain Dupuis as Kevin Jacquemin
 Joannie Lalancette as Bénédicte Jacquemin
 Guillaume Richard as Sylvain Demaison
 Sébastien Richard as Raphaël Demaison
 Sylvie Beauregard as Sophie Dutilly
 Olivier Vadnais as Marc-Antoine Biron
 Roland Chenail as Dr. René Boudrias
 Andrée Champagne as Éliane Boudrias
 Gwladys Breault Joseph as Gwladys
 Marc Picard as Policeman
 Pierre Gobeil as Marcel Cantin
 Pascal Rollin as Régis de Vercor
 Monique Joly as Suzanne Riopel
 Robert Bouchard as Farmer
 Claude Desjardins as Constant Soucy 
 Yvan Canuel as Laurent Dantin's trustee
 Jean-Guy Bouchard as Policeman

References

External links

1970s Canadian drama television series
Television shows set in Quebec
Ici Radio-Canada Télé original programming
1978 Canadian television series debuts
1984 Canadian television series endings
Téléromans
1980s Canadian drama television series